Lesbian, gay, bisexual, and transgender  (LGBT) rights in the Kingdom of Denmark rank among the highest in the world. The Kingdom consists of the Realm of Denmark a sovereign state compromising three constituent countries: Denmark, Greenland and the Faroe Islands. 

In Denmark, same-sex sexual activity was legalized in 1933, and since 1977, the age of consent has been equally set to 15, regardless of sexual orientation or gender. Denmark was the first country in the world to grant legal recognition to same-sex unions in the form of registered partnerships in 1989. On 7 June 2012, the law was replaced by a new same-sex marriage law, which came into effect on 15 June 2012. Greenland and the Faroe Islands legalized same-sex marriage in April 2016 and July 2017 respectively.

Discrimination on the grounds of sexual orientation was entirely prohibited in 1996. Denmark has allowed same-sex couples to jointly adopt since 2010, while previously allowing stepchild adoptions and limited co-guardianship rights for non-biological parents. LGBT people are also allowed to serve openly in the Danish military. Like its Scandinavian neighbours, Denmark has become one of the most socially liberal countries in the world, with recent polls indicating that a large majority of Danes support same-sex marriage and LGBT adoption. Copenhagen has frequently been referred to by publishers as one of the most gay-friendly cities in the world, famous for its annual Pride parade. Denmark's oldest LGBT organization, LGBT Danmark, was founded in 1948, under the name Kredsen af 1948 (Circle of 1948).

Legality of same-sex sexual activity
Same-sex sexual activity was legalized in 1933, and since 1977 the age of consent has been 15, regardless of sexual orientation or gender.

Recognition of same-sex relationships

Registered partnerships were created by a law enacted on 7 June 1989, the world's first such law, and came into force on 1 October 1989. Registered partnerships had almost all the same qualities as marriage; all legal and fiscal rights and obligations were similar to those of opposite-sex marriage, with the major exception being that regulations by international treaties did not apply unless all signatories agree. Since 15 June 2012, entering into registered partnerships is no longer possible.

Same-sex marriage became legal in Denmark on 15 June 2012, after the Danish Parliament voted on 7 June in favour of a gender-neutral marriage law, including marriages in the Church of Denmark. The Danish Government proposed a same-sex marriage bill in Parliament on 14 March 2012. Parliament passed the bill by 85 votes to 24 on 7 June, and royal assent by Queen Margrethe II was granted five days later. The law entered into force on 15 June 2012.

Adoption and family planning

Since 1999, a person in a same-sex registered partnership has been able to adopt his or her partner's biological children (known as stepchild adoption). Adoption by LGBT parents was previously only permitted in certain restricted situations, notably when a previous connection existed between the adopting parent and the child, such as being a family member or a foster child.

On 2 June 2006, the Danish Parliament voted to repeal a law that banned lesbian couples from accessing artificial insemination. In addition, when a lesbian couple has a child via in vitro fertilization, the non-biological parent has been written onto the birth certificate as the other natural parent since 2013.

Since 1 July 2010, same-sex couples may apply jointly for adoption. On 20 July 2014, a gay male couple became the first gay couple to adopt a foreign child, when they adopted a nine-month-old girl from South Africa.

According to statistics released by the Danish Broadcasting Corporation, 84 families had same-sex parents in 2013. That number had increased to 659 by mid-2018. In the Capital Region, the number grew from 42 to 293. According to 2019 statistics, about 27% of same-sex couples in Denmark were raising a child, whereas that figure was 43% for heterosexual couples.

Military service

Openly gay, lesbian, bisexual and transgender soldiers serve without hindrance in all branches of the Danish Defence. Discrimination against gay, lesbian, bisexual and transgender soldiers in recruitment, placement and promotion is prohibited in Denmark. There are prominent openly gay military leaders in the Defence and there are no reported cases of threats to gays, morale, or national security. A 2010 study indicated that gay men in the Danish Defence show strength and are respected.

Discrimination protections and hate crime laws

Danish law prohibits discrimination based on sexual orientation and gender identity or expression, among other categories. The Act on Prohibition of Unequal Treatment in the Labor Market, adopted in 1996, defines "discrimination" as follows:

Gender identity or expression is not explicitly listed, but a 2015 court ruling, in which a transgender woman filed suit against her former employer for alleged discrimination, held that gender identity or expression is included in the law.

In 2008, the Act on the Board of Equal Treatment was passed, establishing the Board of Equal Treatment. Under the Act, the Board "shall consider complaints of differential treatment on the grounds of gender, race, colour, religion or belief, political opinion, sexual orientation, age, disability, or national, social or ethnic origin".

In addition, Denmark possesses hate crime legislation, following amendments to the Penal Code in 2004, which provides additional penalties for crimes committed against people because of their sexual orientation.

According to a report published in August 2019, 89% of LGBT respondents reported not being discriminated against or harassed in the workplace, 78% were overall satisfied with their jobs and 69% reported being open about their sexual orientation to colleagues. Only 9% felt they could not be open about their sexual orientation, and 8% stated they had been the victim of discrimination and harassment.

Transgender rights

The Act on Sterilisation and Castration, adopted in June 1929, was one of the first gender change laws in the world. The first person to successfully undertake a legal gender change in Denmark, which required undergoing sex reassignment surgery, was American Christine Jorgensen in the early 1950s. She underwent an orchiectomy and a penectomy in Copenhagen in 1951 and 1952, respectively. Danish transgender woman Lili Elbe, who inspired the 2015 movie The Danish Girl, was one of the first identifiable recipients of sex reassignment surgery. She transitioned in Germany in 1930, and later had her sex and name legally changed on her Danish passport.

In February 2013, a Guatemalan woman became the first transgender person to be granted asylum in Denmark because of persecution in her native country. However, she was put in a facility for men, where she had been sexually assaulted several times and was initially refused. Authorities reopened the case when she proved her life would be in danger if she returned to Guatemala.

In June 2014, the Danish Parliament voted 59–52 to remove the requirement of a mental disorder diagnosis and surgery with irreversible sterilization during the process of a legal sex change. Since 1 September 2014, Danes over 18 years of age who wish to apply for a legal sex change can do so by stating that they want to change their documentation, followed by a six-month-long "reflection period" to confirm the request.

Pending a decision by the World Health Organization (WHO) to remove transgender gender identity from its list of mental illnesses, Denmark initially postponed a unilateral change. Citing a lack of progress at the WHO, the Danish Parliament decided to remove transgender identity from the National Board of Health's list of mental illnesses in 2016. The change came into effect on 1 January 2017. It was the second country to do this, after France which did so in 2010. The WHO eventually removed transgender identity from its list of mental illnesses in June 2018.

Besides male and female, Danish passports are available with an "X" sex descriptor.

Sex education
Denmark has one of the most comprehensive sex education lessons in the world, which includes information on safe sex, prevention against sexually transmitted infections, abortion, contraception, puberty, sexual relationships, family life, gender and sexuality, and diversity. Sex education lessons are mandatory in all primary and secondary public schools, and also deal with other health issues, including drug use and alcohol.

In 1981, Gå-Ud-Gruppen ("The Outreach Group") set up supplementary sex education lessons giving information about same-sex relationships to senior classes in state schools.

In 2008, the Danish Family Planning Association introduced a new online nationwide campaign for sex education. By 2009, 88,300 pupils were participating.

Blood donation
In May 2014, six Danish political parties called on Health Minister Nick Hækkerup to lift a ban on blood donations from men who have sex with men (MSM). In August 2016, it was reported that a majority of MPs in Parliament supported lifting the ban. The Danish People's Party, the Social Democrats and The Alternative all expressed support for a proposal put forward by MP Morten Østergaard to permit blood donations by MSMs. In March 2020, Denmark implemented a policy allowing gay and bisexual men to donate blood provided they have not had sex in four months. The deferral period will be waived off if the individual is in a stable monogamous relationship.

LGBT rights movement in Denmark

Danish LGBT advocacy groups include LGBT Danmark, founded in 1948 under the name Kredsen af 1948 (Circle of 1948) and later changing its name to Forbundet af 1948 (Federation of 1948). The group officially registered as an association under the name Landsforeningen for homofile (National Association for Homosexuals) in 1969. The organisation's founder was Axel Axgil. Axel and his partner Eigil Axgil were the first same-sex couple to enter into a registered partnership in Denmark, and therefore the first in the world, in 1989. The first gay demonstration in Denmark occurred in 1971 to mark the two-year anniversary of the Stonewall riots. From the 1970s onwards, numerous gay bars and clubs opened, and societal acceptance began to grow. In 1974, several members of the Federation of 1948, along with members of the Red Stocking Movement, split to form their own organization, the Lesbian Movement (Lesbisk Bevægelse). Other groups include Lambda, based in Odense, as well as Q-Factor, Bigruppen and Dunst.

Copenhagen Pride is an annual pride event held in August in Copenhagen. It was first held in 1996 under the name Mermaid Pride, in reference to The Little Mermaid. About 25,000 people marched in the 2017 Copenhagen Pride parade, and a further 300,000 people attended and watched the event. In 2018, about 40,000 people took part in the event, with thousands more attending. Among these was Prime Minister Lars Løkke Rasmussen.

Apart from Copenhagen Pride, other LGBT events include Aarhus Pride, MIX Copenhagen, a film festival, and the Diversity Party Odense (Mangfoldighedsfest Odense) which was first held in 2017.

Public opinion
A December 2006 European Union member poll by Angus Reid Global Monitor showed Danish support for same-sex marriage at 69%, in third place behind the Netherlands (82%) and Sweden (71%).

According to a 2013 YouGov poll, 59% of respondents thought that same-sex couples should be allowed to adopt children, while 79% believed same-sex couples should be allowed to marry.

The 2015 Eurobarometer found that 87% of Danes thought same-sex marriage should be allowed throughout Europe, 90% thought lesbian, gay and bisexual people should have the same rights as heterosexuals, and 88% agreed that "there is nothing wrong" about a sexual relationship between two people of the same sex. The 2019 Eurobarometer found that 89% of Danes thought same-sex marriage should be allowed throughout Europe, and 90% agreed that "there is nothing wrong in a sexual relationship between two persons of the same sex".

Summary table
''Please note: when a jurisdiction is not specified, the right applies to the whole of the Kingdom of Denmark.

See also

Human rights in Denmark
LGBT Danmark
LGBT rights in the Faroe Islands
LGBT rights in Greenland
LGBT rights in Europe
LGBT rights in the European Union
LGBT rights in the Americas
LGBT rights by country or territory
Aarhus Pride
Copenhagen Pride
Aabenraa Pride
Nuuk Pride

Notes

References

 
1933 in law